George Henry Ward (22 April 1877 – 2 August 1921) was an Australian rules footballer who played with Essendon in the Victorian Football League (VFL).

Family
The son of Arthur James Ward (1847-1914), and Helen Ward (1846-1928), née Gardner, George Henry Ward was born in  Richmond, Victoria on 22 April 1877.

Military service
He enlisted in the First AIF on 6 July 1915, and served overseas with the 60th Battalion. He was wounded in action, in France, on 19 July 1916, where he sustained gunshot wounds to his right arm and left leg. He required four operations, and his left leg was amputated mid-thigh, in France. He was repatriated to England, and spent more than 12 months hospitalized there. He was declared unfit for general service in November 1917, and left England in March 1918, returning to Australia in May 1918.

Death
He "committed suicide while suffering from [war caused] mental depression" in the dressing shed at the Yarra bathing ground, in Alphington, Victoria, in August 1921 (he was last seen on 2 August 1921, and his body was discovered, with the throat cut, and a razor lying near the body, on 11 August 1921). He was buried at the Boroondara General Cemetery on 13 August 1921.

Notes

References
 
 Maplestone, M., Flying Higher: History of the Essendon Football Club 1872–1996, Essendon Football Club, (Melbourne), 1996. 
 First World War Nominal Roll: Private George Henry Ward (3284), collection of the Australian War Memorial
 First World War Embarkation Roll: Private George Henry Ward (3284), collection of the Australian War Memorial
 First World War Service Record: Private George Henry Ward (3284), National Archives of Australia
 Australia's Roll of Honor: 191st Casualty List: Wounded: Victoria, The Age, (Thursday, 10 August 1916), p.7.

External links 

1877 births
1921 deaths
Australian rules footballers from Melbourne
Essendon Football Club players
Australian military personnel of World War I
Australian military personnel who committed suicide
1921 suicides
Suicides by sharp instrument in Australia
Suicides in Victoria (Australia)
Military personnel from Melbourne
People from Richmond, Victoria